This is a list of Provinces of Vanuatu by Human Development Index as of 2021.

See also
List of countries by Human Development Index

References

References 

Human Development Index
Ranked lists of country subdivisions
Economy of Vanuatu